Luis Miguel Valle Juárez (born April 11, 1989) is a Costa Rican professional midfielder currently playing for Pérez Zeledón in Liga FPD.

Club career
Valle came through the youth ranks at Liga and has played for the senior team since making his debut against Pérez Zeledón on 22 March 2009.

International career
Valle made his debut for Costa Rica in a July 2011 Copa América match against Argentina and has, as of December 2014, earned a total of 3 caps, scoring no goals.

References

External links
 
 

1989 births
Living people
Association football midfielders
Costa Rican footballers
Costa Rica international footballers
2011 Copa América players
2013 Copa Centroamericana players
Copa Centroamericana-winning players
L.D. Alajuelense footballers
Liga FPD players